Thomas Forkner (June 14, 1918 – April 26, 2017) was an American businessman, lawyer, and notable senior golfer. He was a co-founder of restaurant chain Waffle House, which as of April 2018 consisted of 2,100 restaurants.

Biography
Born in Hawkinsville, Georgia on June 14, 1918, Tom Forkner was the fifth of seven children of Ben and Bessie Forkner; his siblings include Louise, Lawrence, Catherine, Ben, John, and William. Forkner graduated Young Harris Junior College before getting a law degree from the Woodrow Wilson College of Law. The son of a real estate agent, he practiced law until called to serve in World War II as an intelligence officer for the Manhattan Project. Forkner trained at Camp Ritchie and is considered to be a Ritchie Boy - a group who was responsible for uncovering two thirds of intelligence in the European Theatre. After his return from the war, he took over his father's real estate firm, working in Avondale Estates, Georgia.

Waffle House

In 1949, Forkner sold a home to Joe Rogers Sr. Inspired by the emergence of fast food chains like McDonald's, Rogers, who was a regional manager of the Toddle House chain of diners in Memphis, Tennessee, proposed that he and Forkner go into business together for a quick-service, sit-down restaurant. Forkner suggested a Toddle House, but Rogers felt the chain wasn't proper for the market. After Forkner secured the property, the pair developed the concept of the Waffle House together: Forkner proposed naming it after the most profitable item on the menu to promote it, while Rogers suggested keeping a 24-hour schedule. The first Waffle House opened in Avondale in 1955. Over the next several years, the pair expanded the chain, beginning to offer franchises after 1960. As of 2005, Forkner and Rogers, though having passed the helm of the company to Joe Rogers Jr. in 1973, still worked for the company occasionally, including on major holidays. In 2007, Forkner was still visiting his office daily.

Golf
Forkner started golfing as part of a lifestyle change after health problems put him in the hospital in 1959. He was widely successful as a senior golfer, and on January 6, 2007 was inducted into the Georgia Golf Hall of Fame. Among his achievements, he was on four occasions named the Georgia Senior Champion (1968, 1969, and 1986) and twice International Senior Champion (1974 and 1980). In 2003 and 2004, he was World Super Seniors Champion for ages 80 and Over. Forkner, who competed in the 1980 and 1981 U.S. Senior Opens, once placed second there, which in keeping in mind the competition he described to The Augusta Chronicle in 2007 as "probably the single best thing I ever did."

Personal life and death
In the 1940s, he married wife Martha, with whom he shares three children. As of 2007, he lived in Duluth, Georgia. Forkner died on April 27, 2017 at the age of 98, only one month after the death of Joe Rogers, his business partner.

See also

References

External links
2014 Video Interview with Tom Forkner by Cynthia C. Kelly Voices of the Manhattan Project

American food company founders
Fast-food chain founders
Waffle House people
Georgia (U.S. state) lawyers
Businesspeople from Georgia (U.S. state)
20th-century American businesspeople
20th-century American lawyers
Manhattan Project people
American male golfers
Ritchie Boys
Golfers from Georgia (U.S. state)
Young Harris College alumni
People from Hawkinsville, Georgia
People from Duluth, Georgia
People from Avondale Estates, Georgia
1918 births
2017 deaths
21st-century American businesspeople